Maria Staghøj Durhuus (born 25 September 1977) is a Danish politician and member of the Folketing, the national legislature. A Social Democrat, she has represented Greater Copenhagen since November 2022.

Durhuus was born on 25 September 1977 in Ringkøbing. She is the daughter of Hans Arne Staghøj and educator Lilian Steffensen. She was educated at Thisted Gymnasium og HF and studied nursing. She was a nurse at various establishments from 2006 to 2019. She worked for Copenhagen City Council's Thorupgården housing scheme from 2020 to 2022. She was a member of the municipal council in Hvidovre Municipality from 2013 to 2022.

Durhuus has four sons.

References

External links

1977 births
Danish municipal councillors
Living people
Members of the Folketing 2022–2026
People from Hvidovre Municipality
Social Democrats (Denmark) politicians
Women members of the Folketing